The cuisine of Niger draws on traditional African cuisines. Various spices are used and meals include grilled meat, seasonal vegetables, salads, and various sauces. Meals in Niger usually start with colorful salads made from seasonal vegetables. Moringa leaves are a favorite for a salad.

Typical Nigerien meals consist of a starch (rice being the most popular) paired with a sauce or stew. The starches eaten most often are millet and rice. Staple foods include millet, rice, cassava, sorghum, maize and beans. Couscous is saved for special occasions. Porridge, wheat dumplings, and beignets are some of Niger's popular snacks.

Plant agriculture production in Niger is significantly reliant upon rainfall to provide water for plants, and droughts have adversely affected Niger's agriculture production in the past, threatening the country's domestic food supply.

Tea is a popular beverage in Niger.

Spices
Some spices were brought to Niger by Arabian travelers, and include ginger, nutmeg, cinnamon, saffron, and cloves. Hot spices are also used in Nigerien cuisine. Sometimes spices are used to marinate meats to add flavor.

Common dishes

 Jollof rice
 :fr: Dambou ( or rice couscous)
 Dambou, dish made from cereals and moringa leaves
 Moringa, prepared with leaves of the "drumstick tree", the pods and flowers of which are also edible
 Stews and soups
 Millet porridge
 Palm nut soup

Common foods

 Beans
 Black-eyed peas 
 Cassava root
 Chicken
 Chickpeas 
 Dates
 Fish
 Goat
 Coarse grains 
 Millet
 Sorghum
 Groundnuts
 Maize
 Mango
 Onion
 Beef
Camel meat
Guinea fowl
Mutton
Tiger nuts
Fonio
 Rice
 Squash
 Cooked yams
 Yogurt

See also

 African cuisine
 List of African dishes

References

Notes

Bibliography
 Von Braun, Joachim (1995). Employment for Poverty Reduction and Food Security. Intl Food Policy Res Inst. pp. 174–196. 

 
Niger